Fuzion Frenzy is a launch title for the Microsoft Xbox. At its core, Fuzion Frenzy is a four-player party game featuring 45 different mini-games (not including the titular Fuzion Frenzy). A demo of the game was included with some other launch titles in the U.S., including Halo, Munch's Oddysee, Project Gotham Racing and Amped.

A sequel was later released for the Xbox 360, entitled Fuzion Frenzy 2.

Gameplay
Up to four players can compete in two different game modes: "Tournament" or "Mini-Game Frenzy". Mini-Game Frenzy is the simpler of the two, involving players selecting individual mini-games while an ongoing tabulation of wins per player is maintained. In contrast, the Tournament mode is the core game mode, where players attempt to earn the highest number of points after playing through two or more play zones.

There are a total of six zones in the game:
 Coliseum - Rolling Ball and Ice Car mini-games.
 Downtown - Fireworks and Music mini-games.
 Outlands - Demolition and Tail-bone mini-games.
 Military Base - Pod and Tank mini-games.
 Power Station - Hopper and Splat mini-games.
 Waterfront - Jetboat and Orb mini-games.

During game setup, players choose from one of six characters (the differences are cosmetic only), with the remaining player slots being filled by computer AI. The number of zones to play through is also selected (2, 4, or 6). The exact zones which are used during play (if fewer than 6) are determined randomly, in addition to the order in which the zones are played. Unlike other party games such as the Mario Party series or Sonic Shuffle, Fuzion Frenzy has no overarching game board, rather, players proceed from one random mini-game to another, and from zone to zone, in a randomized order. The traversal between zones is depicted as a route on a map which never crosses itself, limiting the possible transitions between zones.

In each zone, three random mini-games are played. For mini-games which are team games, players are paired randomly. Some mini-games are timed, and some are not. Mini-games that are timed usually have a time limit of either 60 seconds (1:00) or 90 seconds (1:30) to play, though some even last for 120 seconds (2:00). Most un-timed mini-games have a "last player standing wins" rule. At the conclusion of each mini-game, players (or teams) are awarded a number of orbs (6, 4, 2, or 0) proportional to their final standing (1st through 4th) in the event. If there is a tie for 1st, 2nd, or 3rd place; the orbs are split proportionally. Regardless, the orbs accumulate throughout the zone. Once a new zone begins, the players start from scratch.

Once the third mini-game is finished, the zone ends with the special "Fuzion Frenzy" mini-game. Each player must decide whether to bank their orbs (converting each orb directly into 10 points), or put them into play for this Fuzion Frenzy. Players are free to wager any number of orbs, including any or all of the orbs they collected, but they have to wager at least 3 orbs.

The players are then put in an arena, where glowing orbs appear at random. Some of these orbs are colorless, while others are the colored orbs wagered by the players. Within 80 seconds (1:20), each player attempts to grab orbs and deliver them to the goal zones in order to score points. Players can only pick up colorless orbs or orbs that match their color. However, once a player picks up an orb, it becomes colorless, and others players can steal it by attacking the carrier. Players can carry more than one orb at once, and delivering more than one orb at a time provides a score bonus.

When the 80-second (1:20) timer ends, the points earned in the Fuzion Frenzy are added to a player's total, and it is this total that determines the eventual winner of the zone. Thus, anyone who didn't finish first after the three mini-games may still win the overall zone by performing exceptionally well in the Fuzion Frenzy. If there is a tie between two or more players at the end of the final Fuzion Frenzy, a tie-breaker mini-game is played to determine the winner.

Characters
There are six playable characters in the game:

Reception

The game received above-average reviews according to the review aggregation website Metacritic. NextGen called it "the best party game you can buy for Xbox – OK, it's the only party game you can buy for Xbox, but at least it's fast and fun."

By July 2006, the game had sold 680,000 copies and earned $16 million in the U.S. NextGen ranked it as the 93rd highest-selling game launched for the PlayStation 2, Xbox or GameCube between January 2000 and July 2006 in that country.

References

External links 

2001 video games
Microsoft games
Party video games
Video games developed in the United Kingdom
Xbox games
Xbox Originals games
Xbox-only games
Blitz Games Studios games
Multiplayer and single-player video games

pt:Fuzion Frenzy